Booth (actor) may refer to:

Barton Booth (1681–1733), one of the most famous dramatic actors of the first part of the 18th century.
Edwin Booth, (1833–1893), a famous 19th-century American actor.
Junius Brutus Booth (1796–1852), an English actor and father of:
Junius Brutus Booth, Jr. (1821–1883), an American actor and theatre manager.
Edwin Thomas Booth (1833–1893), the foremost American tragedian of the mid-to-late 19th century.
John Wilkes Booth, (1838–1865), an American actor who assassinated President Abraham Lincoln.
Agnes Booth (1843–1910), born Marion Agnes Land Rookes, was an Australian born American actress (married to Junius Brutus Booth, Jr.)
Booth Colman (1923–2014), a film, television and stage actor.
James Booth (1927–2005), an English actor.
Antony  Booth (1931–2017), an English actor, best known for his role as Mike Rawlins in the BBC series Till Death Us Do Part.
Billy Booth (actor), (1949–2006), an American child actor, perhaps best known for his role as Jay North's best friend Tommy Anderson on the sitcom Dennis the Menace.
Tim Booth (born 1960), an English singer, dancer, and actor best known as the lead singer from the band James.
Stefan Booth (born 1979) is an English actor and singer.
Zachary Booth (born 1982), an American actor.
Douglas Booth (born 1992), an English actor known for his portrayal of Boy George in the BBC Two television drama Worried About the Boy.
Cornelius Booth an actor best known for his role as Colonel Fitzwilliam in the 2005 adaptation of Pride & Prejudice.
Matthew Booth (actor), an English actor from Normanton, West Yorkshire.

See also
Booth family
Booth's Theatre
Lillian Booth Actors Home